"Uno, dos, ultraviolento" (in English: One, two, ultraviolent) is a song by Argentine punk rock band Los Violadores, featured as a single from their Y ahora que pasa, eh? album from 1985. The song was Los Violadores breakthrough as one of the better known punk rock bands of Argentina. The lyrics are inspired in the novella A Clockwork Orange. It was also covered in the 1990s by former Chilean band Los Prisioneros member, Claudio Narea with great success in the country.

Die Toten Hosen have covered the single in their album La hermandad – en el principio fue el ruido.

Track listing

12": Umbral / DX 1700 
A-Side
"Uno, dos, ultraviolento" - 5:30
"Por 1980 y Tantos" - 3:23

B-Side
"El Corregidor" - 4:35
"Auschwitz" - 2:31
"Chicas De La Cal" - 2:50

Personnel 
Musicians
Pil Trafa – Lead vocals
Stuka – Lead guitar, backing vocals.
Robert "Polaco" Zelazeck – Bass.
Sergio Gramática – Drums.

Additional personnel
Carlos "Mundy" Epifanio - Producer.
Ramon Villanueva - Executive producer.

1985 singles
Los Violadores songs
1985 songs